Robert M. Benedict is an American author, business owner & former politician from Minnesota, and at that time, a member of the Democratic-Farmer-Labor party. He published his first book in 1972 and entered the political scene a year later.

Education
Benedict graduated from the University of Minnesota in 1972.

Political career
In 1973, he was the National Director of the Center for Improved Child Nutrition. While in the position, he was brought to speak in favor of increasing the quality and size of school lunches in public schools by the Select Committee on Nutrition and Human Needs. He first served as Mayor of Bloomington, Minnesota, from 1974 to 1977. He became mayor at the age of just 23. He was elected thrice but resigned midway through his third term to represent Hennepin County in the Minnesota State Senate representing district 38, where he served from 1977 to 1981. He also became the youngest person ever to enter the State Senate being just 26 at the time.

After politics
In 1984, Benedict founded Benedict Negotiating Seminars. He has served as president ever since. He has written multiple books, such as 'The Possible Dream','Negotiating in the real world of publishing and engineering','The Freedom Account', and 'Happiness doesn't just happen', Published in 1972, 1989, 2015, and 2019 respectivally.

References

Minnesota state senators
Mayors of places in Minnesota
Politicians from Minneapolis
20th-century American politicians
University of Minnesota alumni
Bloomington, Minnesota
Living people
1955 births